Uintah Lake is one of many lakes in Uinta Mountains in Duchesne County, Utah, United States.

Although it has a slightly different spelling, the name of the lake has the same etymology as the mountain range in which it is located.

References

Lakes of Duchesne County, Utah